The Even Now Tour (also known as the North American Tour and advertised as Barry Manilow in Concert) is the fourth concert tour by American recording artist Barry Manilow. The tour supports his fifth studio album Even Now (1978). Beginning in the summer of 1978, Manilow performed over 60 shows in North America and, marks the first time the singer performed in Europe.

During this jaunt, Manilow played 15 shows at the Greek Theatre in Los Angeles, California; performing for 72,000 people. Footage of the concerts became the singer's first HBO special, airing in 1979.

Opening act
Eddy Arnold

Setlist
The following setlist was obtained from the concert held on July 17, 1978, at the Blossom Music Center in Cuyahoga Falls, Ohio. It does not represent all concerts for the duration of the tour. 
Act I
"Here We Go Again"
"New York City Rhythm"
"Daybreak"
"Even Now"
"Jump Shout Boogie" / "Avenue C" / "Jumpin' at the Woodside" / "Cloudburst" / "Bandstand Boogie"
"Ready to Take a Chance Again"
"Weekend in New England"
"Looks Like We Made It"
"A Very Strange Medley"
Act II
"Beautiful Music"
"I Was a Fool (To Let You Go)"
"All the Time"
"Copacabana (At the Copa)"
"Tryin' to Get the Feeling Again" / "This One's for You" / "Could It Be Magic" / "Mandy" / "Could It Be Magic" 
"It's a Miracle"
"Can't Smile Without You"
Encore
"I Write the Songs"

Tour dates

Festivals and other miscellaneous performances
This concert was a part of the "Radio Programming Conference"

Cancellations and rescheduled shows

Box office score data

References

Barry Manilow
1978 concert tours